Boarding Pass (Persian: کارت پرواز, romanized: Kart-e Parvaz) is a 2017 Iranian drama film directed by Mehdi Rahmani and written by Rahmani, Amir Arabi and Babak Mirzakhani. The film screened for the first time at the 33rd Warsaw Film Festival.

Cast 

 Neda Jebraeili as Neda
 Mansour Shahbazi as Masoud
 Mohammad Ali Najafian
 Asghar Rafijam as Doctor
 Shirin Yazdanbakhsh as Old Woman
 Tala Motazedi
 Bardia Hosseini as Bardia

References

External links 

2010s Persian-language films
Iranian drama films
2017 drama films